Sumit Hridayesh is an Indian politician and the MLA from Haldwani Assembly constituency. He is a member of the Indian National Congress.

References 

Living people
Indian National Congress politicians from Uttarakhand
People from Nainital district
Uttarakhand MLAs 2022–2027
Year of birth missing (living people)